Philotheca pachyphylla is a species of flowering plant in the family Rutaceae and is endemic to Western Australia. It is a small shrub with fleshy, oblong, prominently glandular-warty leaves and white flowers arranged singly in leaf axils.

Description
The ten stamens are free from each other and densely woolly-hairy. Flowering occurs from May to September.

Taxonomy and naming
This philotheca was first formally described in 1970 by Paul Wilson who gave it the name Eriostemon pachyphyllus and published the description in the journal Nuytsia from specimens collected near Coolgardie by Marie Elizabeth Phillips in 1962. In 1998, Wilson changed the name to Philotheca pachyphylla in the same journal.

Distribution and habitat
Philotheca pachyphylla grows in sandy loam on sandplains and hilltops west of Coolgardie and in the Bremer Range in the Coolgardie biogeographic region in Western Australia.

Conservation status
Philotheca pachyphylla is classified as "Priority One" by the Government of Western Australia Department of Parks and Wildlife, meaning that it is known from only one or a few locations which are potentially at risk.

References

pachyphylla
Flora of Western Australia
Sapindales of Australia
Plants described in 1970
Taxa named by Paul G. Wilson